The Avana Stream is a stream in the Ngatangiia district on Rarotonga in the Cook Islands. It flows in the Avana Valley and exits into the Muri Lagoon at Vaikai Tapere. A water intake on the stream supplies water to half of Rarotonga's population.

See also
List of rivers of the Cook Islands

References

Rivers of the Cook Islands
Rarotonga